This list contains only the films that Laurel and Hardy made together. For their solo films see Stan Laurel filmography and Oliver Hardy filmography.

Laurel and Hardy were a motion picture comedy team whose official filmography consists of 106 films released between 1921 and 1951. Together they appeared in 34 silent shorts, 45 sound shorts, and 27 full-length sound feature films. In addition to these, Laurel and Hardy appeared in at least 20 foreign-language versions of their films and a promotional film, Galaxy of Stars (1936), produced for European film distributors.

Stan Laurel (1890–1965) and Oliver Hardy (1892–1957) were established as film comedians prior to their teaming, with Laurel appearing in over 50 silent films and Hardy in over 250. (Hardy also appeared in three sound features without Laurel.) Although they first worked together in the film The Lucky Dog (1921), this was a chance pairing and it was not until 1926 when both separately signed contracts with the Hal Roach film studio that they appeared in film shorts together. Laurel and Hardy officially became a team the following year with their 11th silent short film, The Second Hundred Years (1927). The pair remained with the Roach studio until 1940. Between 1941 and 1945, they appeared in eight features and one short for 20th Century Fox and Metro-Goldwyn-Mayer. After finishing their film commitments, Laurel and Hardy concentrated on stage shows, embarking on a music hall tour of Great Britain. In 1950, they appeared in their last film, Atoll K, a French/Italian coproduction.

In 1932, Laurel and Hardy's short The Music Box won the Academy Award for Live Action Short Film (Comedy). In 1960, Laurel was presented with an Academy Honorary Award "for his creative pioneering in the field of cinema comedy." In 1992, 1997, 2012 and 2020 respectively, Big Business (1929), The Music Box, Sons of the Desert (1932) and The Battle of the Century (1927) were added to the United States National Film Registry by the Library of Congress as being "culturally, historically, or aesthetically significant." For their contributions to cinema, Laurel and Hardy have been awarded separate stars on the Hollywood Walk of Fame.

Filmography

Official films
The following is a list of Laurel and Hardy's official filmography as established in Laurel and Hardy: The Magic Behind the Movies by Randy Skretvedt and Laurel and Hardy by John McCabe, Al Kilgore, and Richard R. Bann. Each book lists 105 films and Skredvedt's adds a 106th in its appendix, Now I'll Tell One, a previously lost film that was partly rediscovered.

Except where noted, all of these films were photographed in black and white, produced by Hal Roach, and released by Metro-Goldwyn-Mayer. Except where noted, all short films are two reels in length. All films produced prior to 1928 are silent and all films made after 1929 are sound. Releases from 1928 are silent except as noted. 1929 releases are identified as silent, all-talkie, or sound films with music and sound effects only.

Foreign-language versions
During the early days of sound American motion picture companies often made foreign-language versions of their films. The following is a list of known foreign-language versions of Laurel and Hardy films.

Note: A lost German-language version of The Hollywood Revue of 1929, Wir Schalten um auf Hollywood (We Switch to Hollywood), was made and released in 1931. Apparently Laurel and Hardy do not appear in it.

Promotional film

Compilation films

References

Notes

Footnotes

Bibliography

External links

 
 Laurel and Hardy Magazine
 
 

Filmography
Filmography
Comedy film series
Male actor filmographies
British filmographies
American filmographies